CH Boadilla is an ice hockey team in Boadilla del Monte, Spain. They played in the Superliga Espanola de Hockey Hielo from 1979-1990.

History
CH Boadilla was founded in 1979 as the successor club to CH Madrid. The club struggled in their first two years in the Superliga, and were relegated to the Segunda Division. They then promptly won the Segunda Division, and were promoted again to the Superliga. They were then again relegated to the Segunda Division, which they then won in the 1983-84 season, and were thus promoted again. They finished in 5th place in 1985 and in 6th place in 1989 and 1990. The club has consisted solely of junior teams since 1990.

Results
1980 6th place
1981 7th place
1982 1st in Segunda Division
1983 6th place
1984 1st in Segunda Division
1985 6th
1986-1988 No championship
1989 6th place
1990 6th place

External links
 Spanish Ice Hockey Federation 

Ice hockey teams in Spain
Ice hockey clubs established in 1979
Sport in the Community of Madrid
1979 establishments in Spain
Boadilla del Monte